Calamotropha melanosticta is a moth in the family Crambidae. It was described by George Hampson in 1896. It is found in Sri Lanka.

Description
Its wingspan is 16–20 mm. The palpi are white at their tips. The forewings have two oblique medial-costal brown striga continued as a single medial line angled below costa, with a black spot on it at vein 2. The submarginal line brown, further from margin, double from the costa to its angle at vein 6 and incurved at vein 2. A slight brown marginal line present along with silvery cilia.

References

Crambinae
Moths described in 1896